"Whipped Cream" is an instrumental most famously recorded by Herb Alpert & the Tijuana Brass.  It is the title track of their 1965 LP, Whipped Cream & Other Delights, and was released as the lead single from the album.  The song was written by Allen Toussaint under the pen name of Naomi Neville (after his mother), and originally recorded by The Stokes.

Alpert's recording of "Whipped Cream" became a hit on the U.S. Billboard Hot 100 (#68) and Adult Contemporary chart (#13). It was also a minor hit in Australia. It later was used as part of the music for the ABC television show The Dating Game.

Personnel
According to the AFM contract, the following people played on the track.

Herb Alpert
Frank DeVito
Carol Kaye
Ervan Coleman
Bob Edmondson
Richard Leith
Pete Jolly
William Green
David Alpert
Virgil Evans
Don Ralke

Chart history

References

External links
 

A&M Records singles
1965 songs
1965 singles
Songs written by Allen Toussaint
Herb Alpert songs
1960s instrumentals